Natore-4 is a constituency represented in the Jatiya Sangsad (National Parliament) of Bangladesh since 2008 by Abdul Quddus of the Awami League.

Boundaries 
The constituency encompasses Baraigram and Gurudaspur.

History 
The constituency was created in 1984 from a Rajshahi constituency when the former Rajshahi District was split into four districts: Nawabganj, Naogaon, Rajshahi, and Natore.

Members of Parliament

Elections

Elections in the 2010s 
Abdul Quddus was re-elected unopposed in the 2014 general election after opposition parties withdrew their candidacies in a boycott of the election.

Elections in the 2000s

Elections in the 1990s

References

External links
 

Parliamentary constituencies in Bangladesh
Natore District